Smile... It Confuses People is the debut studio album by Scottish singer Sandi Thom. It was released in both Ireland and the United Kingdom on 5 June 2006 by RCA Records (although the back of the album bears the RCA Music Group logo instead). The album is a mix of pop and folk, predominantly written by Thom herself alongside Tom Gilbert.

The album produced Thom's first number-one single—"I Wish I Was a Punk Rocker (With Flowers in My Hair)"—on the UK Singles Chart, the Irish Singles Chart, and Australia's ARIA Singles Chart. In the latter country, the song spent the longest period at number-one in 2006 (10 weeks) and became the country's highest-selling single for 2006.  The album also generated another two singles, but they both failed to replicate the success of the first single. Smile... It Confuses People was certified platinum by BPI selling three hundred thousand copies around the UK.

Reception

The album went straight to number one in its week of release in the UK. It spent a total of eighteen weeks in the UK top forty. It has since gone platinum in the UK and has sold over 1 million copies worldwide.

In Australia the album reached its peak at #11. On its ninth week in the chart at number fifteen the album was certified gold by ARIA selling thirty-five thousand copies around Australia. It was the seventy-eighth highest selling album for 2006.

I Wish I Was a Punk Rocker (With Flowers in My Hair) was the first song released from the album and topped the UK, Ireland Singles Chart for two weeks the Australian ARIA Singles Chart for ten weeks making it the highest selling single for 2006. It was accredited Double Platinum (140,000 units) by ARIA. "What If I'm Right" was the second song released from the album and reached 22 in the UK and 30 in the Irish chart and top forty in Australia and New Zealand. "Lonely Girl" was the third song released from the album available for digital download only released in the UK on 4 December 2006 and did not chart.

Track listing

Charts and certifications

Weekly charts

Year-end charts

Certifications

Release details

References

2006 debut albums
Sandi Thom albums
RCA Records albums